Most countries issue diplomatic license plates to accredited diplomats. Per the Vienna Convention on Consular Relations, these are special vehicle registration plates which typically have distinctive features to allow diplomatic vehicles to be distinguished from other vehicles by police and other bodies, allowing them to give diplomatic vehicles special treatment and warning them that the operators and passengers of those vehicles may have diplomatic immunity.

History 
It is unknown when the first diplomatic licence plate was issued.

Conventions 
Conventions on the format of diplomatic license plates vary from country to country. They often feature the letters "CD" (for "corps diplomatique"), “CC” (for “corps consulaire”), "D" (for "diplomat") or prefix of international organisations with diplomatic privileges, such as "EU" (for "European Union") and "OSCE" (for Organization for Security and Co-operation in Europe").

Critics 
Critics of these plates say that operators of these vehicles abuse these privileges, often parking in illegal spaces and breaking vehicular law without fear of repercussion.

In 2019, in Japan, 2,600 parking violations involved diplomatic cars, out of which only 25% paid the fine. There are around 1900 cars with diplomatic licence plates in Japan. In Washington DC, from 2002 to 2019, cars with diplomatic plates have accumulated $745,280 in unpaid traffic and parking tickets.

References

External links 
 

Vehicle registration plates
Diplomacy